Engedi is a hamlet in the  community of Bryngwran, Anglesey, Wales, which is 134.1 miles (215.9 km) from Cardiff and 218.9 miles (352.3 km) from London.

References

See also
List of localities in Wales by population 

Villages in Anglesey
Bryngwran